The 2008 Singer Sri Lankan Airlines Rugby 7s was the tenth year and final year of the Singer Sri Lankan Airlines Rugby 7s tournament. Malaysia defeated South Korea 31 - 21 in the final of the Cup.

First round

Pool A

 10 - 10 
 28 - 24   Arabian Gulf
 21 - 12  Arabian Gulf
 52 - 00 
 33 - 00  
 19 - 12  Arabian Gulf
 19 - 07 
 Arabian Gulf 50 - 00  
 41 - 00 
 45 - 00 

{| class="wikitable" style="text-align: center;"
|-
!width="200"|Teams
!width="40"|Pld
!width="40"|W
!width="40"|D
!width="40"|L
!width="40"|PF
!width="40"|PA
!width="40"|+/−
!width="40"|Pts
|-style="background:#ccffcc"
|align=left| 
|4||3||1||0||122||22||+100||11
|-style="background:#ccffcc"
|align=left|  
|4||3||1||0||95||29||+66||11
|-style="background:#ffe6bd"
|align=left| 
|4||2||0||2||68||84||-16||8
|-style="background:#ffe6bd"
|align=left|  Arabian Gulf
|4||1||0||3||98||68||+30||6
|-style="background:#fcc6bd"
|align=left| 
|4||0||0||4||0||180||−180||4
|}

Pool B

 17 - 07 
 21 - 07 
 22 - 7 
 45 - 00 
 45 - 00 
 45 - 00 
 34 - 00 
 31 - 05 
 19 - 07 
 24 - 00 

{| class="wikitable" style="text-align: center;"
|-
!width="200"|Teams
!width="40"|Pld
!width="40"|W
!width="40"|D
!width="40"|L
!width="40"|PF
!width="40"|PA
!width="40"|+/−
!width="40"|Pts
|-style="background:#ccffcc"
|align=left| 
|4||4||0||0||97||14||83||12
|-style="background:#ccffcc"
|align=left| 
|4||3||0||1||116||19||+97||10
|-style="background:#ffe6bd"
|align=left| 
|4||2||0||2||59||79||-20||8
|-style="background:#ffe6bd"
|align=left| 
|4||1||0||3||59||74||-15||6
|-style="background:#fcc6bd"
|align=left| 
|4||0||0||4||10||145||-135||4
|}

Second round

Bowl

Plate

Cup

References

2008
2008 rugby sevens competitions
2008 in Asian rugby union
rugby sevens